This is a list of public art in the London Borough of Lewisham.

Blackheath

Brockley

Catford

Crofton Park

Deptford

Forest Hill

Honor Oak

Lewisham

New Cross

Sydenham

References

External links
 

Public Art
Lists of public art by London borough
Public Art